Krzysztof Zamasz (born July 14, 1974 in Tychy) – Polish manager and economist, associate professor at the Silesian University of Technology and the WSB University in Dąbrowa Górnicza, member of the board of Tauron Polska Energia S.A. from 2008 to 2012, President of the Management Board of ENEA S.A. in 2013–2015, from 2017 to June 2018, a member of the board of the Górnośląsko-Zagłębiowa Metropolis. A board member of the European Investment Fund Luma Holding since July 2018, CEO of LuNa Smelter from July 2018 to August 2019, implemented a Polish investment project in Rwanda  and DR of Congo. Since August 2019, he has been the Development Advisor to the President of the Veolia Group Management Board. From 2019 to present Commercial Director, member of the Board of Directors of Veolia Group in Poland. From November 2020 to May 2022 Chairman of the Board of Veolia Energy Contracting Poland

Biography 
He graduated from the College of Marketing Management and Foreign Languages in Katowice, and the School of Controlling in Katowice. Since 2007, he has been a doctor of economics at the University of Economics in Katowice and was habilitated in 2016 at the University of Szczecin. Currently, he is an associate professor and deputy director of the Institute of Management, Administration and Logistics General Affairs at the Silesian University of Technology in Gliwice. He is the author of many publications devoted to the management of the energy companies and scientific expertises in the field of energy economics, including Rynkowa transformacja sektora usług ciepłowniczych w Polsce – diagnoza, prognoza (PWE, Warszawa 2007), Innowacyjne przedsiębiorstwo energetyczne (współautor, Wydawnictwo Adam Marszałek, Toruń 2015), New Organization of the Power Industry in Poland as Seen From the European Perspective (China- USA Business Review 2015), Efektywność ekonomiczna przedsiębiorstwa energetycznego w warunkach wprowadzania rynku mocy (Wydawnictwo Naukowe PWN, 2015).

During 25 years of his professional life, Krzysztof Zamasz pursued his career in the energy sector, where he implemented projects related to the transformation of the sector. In 1999, he took up a position on the board of Przedsiębiorstwo Energetyki Cieplnej Tychy (PEC Tychy). He was responsible for carrying out an €8 million project with Południowy Koncern Energetyczny. At PEC Tychy, he initiated one of the first boiler replacements in Poland as part of the campaign against low-stack emissions In the years 2007-2008, he was the Chairman of the Management Board in Elektrociepłownia Tychy, belonging to the TAURON.

In 2008, he took up the position of the Vice-President of Trade on the Management Board at TAURON Polska Energia S.A. During four years of sitting on the board, he introduced the company to the Warsaw Stock Exchange, expanded its operations to the markets of Central and Eastern Europe and developed a new business model for the entire value chain of the Group. He participated in transforming of the TAURON Group from a financial holding into an operating holding, in which the parent company assumed responsibility for formulating strategic goals for subsidiaries and coordination or implementation of the key functions in the Group. In 2009, he introduced the new product -TAURON Polska Energia, to the sales market.  He created the first in Poland product certified by the Polish Society for Energy Certification - TAURON EKO Premium, that is energy coming 100% from renewable sources, in particular small hydropower plants and wind farms. The product was awarded with EKOLAUR by the Polish Chamber of Ecology. He also carried out the process of taking over the assets of the Górnośląski Zakład Elektroenergetyczny from Vattenfall company. Thanks to the effective integration of structures, over 1 million individual and business clients have been acquired by TAURON.

In 2012, he became the President of the Management Board of ENEA S. A. During three years, he increased the EBITDA ratio from 375 million EUR in 2012, to 507 EUR million in 2015, he was responsible for the most advanced and ecological investment in Polish power industry - construction of a 1075 MW block with a value of EUR 1.4 billion and for the introduction of corporate governance in the capital group and carrying out restructurtization and optimization processes, which resulted in savings of EUR 143.8 million in 2014-2015. He also created the first venture capital fund in Poland in the Group with a majority stake of the State Treasury. He has expanded and strengthened the Group's value chain through two main projects: strengthening the heating area in the Group as a result of the acquisition of 85% of shares in MPEC Białystok S.A. and construction of an raw energy resources extraction area as a result of a call to subscribe for sale of 64.57% shares in LW Bogdanka, listed on the Polish Stock Exchange, thus implementing one of the largest Merges and Acquisitions transactions (M & A) on the Polish market worth EUR 352.4 million.

From 2017  to June 2018 he was a member of the board of the Górnośląsko-Zagłębiowa Metropolis, where he was responsible for socio-economic development, international cooperation and project and investment management. He took part in negotiations with representatives of the Chinese government in order to launch the transport line from Sławków (Śląskie Voivodeship) to China via the Trans-Caspian route. The project aims to streamline and accelerate the delivery of cargo between Europe and China and includes Silesia in the strategic transcontinental transport route. Sławków is currently the transhipment terminal of the International Trans-Caspian Transport Route located farthest to the West.

After leaving the board of GZM became the plenipotentiary of the Metropolis GZM for cooperation with Africa. He is responsible for supporting the strategic goals of the Metropolis by developing business contacts with African countries. Thanks to similar authorizations, he can represent also Silesian University of Technology and WSB.

In 2018 he became the CEO of LuNa Smelter Ltd. in Rwanda, on behalf of Luma Holding, which is a global investment fund specializing in venture capital and private equity funds. From March 2019 he is a member of the management board in the Luma Holding fund.

On August 1, 2019, he took the position of Advisor to the President of the Management Board for Development of the Veolia Group in Poland , and in September he was appointed Director of Energy at Veolia Poland. In June 2020, he became Commercial Director and member of the Management Board at the Veolia Group in Poland, where he has been in charge of the development of business lines in the areas of energy, water, and waste, and was also responsible for the implementation of several local projects related to the development of the district heating and electricity sectors. 

In the area of waste management projects, he was appointed in September 2020 as President of the Board of Directors of the Veolia Nowa Energia, where he is responsible for the expansion of the Łódź EC4 combined heat and power plant to include an Energy Recovery Facility (ERF), which will use annually 200,000 tons of waste, so-called pre-RDF, generated from municipal waste recovery and recycling processes, as fuel.

In the area of water and wastewater management, he is actively involved in M&A processes and wastewater treatment projects. 

Member of the Wielkopolska Platforma Wodorowa, an opinion-giving and advisory body of the Wielkopolskie Voivodeship Self-Government on issues of conducting economic policy within low- and zero-emission technologies, including hydrogen.

In November 2020, he became President of Veolia Energy Contracting Poland, where he was responsible for the concentration of the trading area with a coherent structure of trading: electricity, gas, energy services, and heat. During his tenure as President, the company became a member of the Polish Power Exchange (TGE) and was successful in 2 major tenders for electricity supply: for PKP PLK and the city of Gdansk for a full-service contract. 

The establishment of the new company brought an increase in energy trading by nearly 30%, an almost 6-fold increase in the number of Energy Points of Sale (PPE ) serviced, and the development of gas trading activities.

References

Polish economists
1974 births
People from Tychy
Living people